FC Bayern Munich II (FC Bayern Munich Amateure until 2005) are the reserve team of German association football club FC Bayern Munich, they currently play in the Regionalliga Bayern. In 2010–11 they played in the 3. Liga, having qualified for its inaugural season in 2008, and have consistently played at the third level of German football (the highest permissible level for reserve teams) – they played in the Regionalliga Süd from its formation in 1994 to 2008, when it was usurped by the 3. Liga. They have generally achieved at least mid-table finishes at this level, and won the Regionalliga Süd title in 2004. In 2010–11 Bayern II finished last in the 3. Liga and was thus relegated to the Regionalliga. They afterwards regained promotion by winning the 2018–19 Regionalliga and won the 3. Liga in 2019–20. The following season, they were relegated from the 3. Liga after an 18th-place finish.

Overview
The team is intended to be the final step between Bayern's youth setup and the first team, and is usually made up of promising youngsters between the age of 18 and 23, with a few veteran players drafted in to provide experience.

Bayern II has made several appearances in the DFB-Pokal, even facing the senior Bayern side in a fourth round tie in 1977 losing 5–3.

History
The team's first appearance in the top-league of Bavarian football, the southern group of the Amateurliga Bayern, came in 1956, when it won the tier-four 2nd Amateurliga Oberbayern A and advanced to the next level through the promotion round. After finishing its first season in this league in mid-table, it ended 1957–58 as runners-up, two points behind local rival FC Wacker München. It repeated this achievement in 1960–61, this time coming second to TSV 1860 Munich II. Both reserve sides then descended in the league table and, in 1963, when the German football league system was severely altered, they both missed the cut-off for the new single-tier Amateurliga Bayern. Bayern Amateure had to finish seventh to qualify but came only 14th and found itself grouped in the new tier-four Landesliga Bayern-Süd.

It took the team four seasons in this league to work its way back up, improving year by year and, in 1966–67, it finished first and earned promotion back to the Bayernliga. Bayern started well in the league, coming fourth in the first year, but then declined and was relegated again in 1971. It only took two seasons this time for the team to return to the third division and another league win in 1973 moved the team back up.

For the next 21 seasons, the team was to be a member of the Bayernliga without interruption. However, in all the 21 seasons there, the team could never win the league either, being ineligible for promotion from there to professional football anyway.

The team had few bad seasons in this time, coming relatively close to relegation only once, in 1982. It managed three runners-up finishes in the league, in 1983, 1984 and 1987 and generally existed as an upper-table side.

In 1994, with the introduction of the new tier-three Regionalliga Süd, the team qualified comfortably. It was to be a long-term member of this league, too, belonging to it until 2008, when the 3. Liga was formed. After mostly finishing in mid-table in the league, Bayern earned its first league title in over 30 years when it won the Regionalliga in 2004. Being already a member of the highest league in which reserve teams are permitted, the side could not take up promotion to the 2nd Bundesliga and had to stay at this level. In 2005, all reserve sides of clubs in the first and second Bundesliga changed their name from Amateure to II, meaning FC Bayern Munich Amateure became FC Bayern Munich II.

In 2008, the team earned promotion to the new 3. Liga, finishing eighth when a top-ten finish was needed. The club played at this level for three seasons before suffering relegation to the Regionalliga in 2010–11. It was the first time since 1973 that the team would not play in the third division and also meant the end of Hermann Gerland as the team's coach.

After coming second in the inaugural Regionalliga Bayern season in 2012–13 the team won the league the following year. This entitled the club to enter the promotion round to the 3. Liga. After two games against Regionalliga West champions Fortuna Köln they lost due to the away goal rule making their opponents one of the three promoted teams to the third division.

In 2019, Bayern Munich II earned promotion to the 3. Liga, after winning Regionalliga 2018–2019 and defeating Wolfsburg II in the two-game promotion-playoff (1–3 and 4–1). The following season, while placing 15th after the first half of the season, Bayern Munich II won the 3. Liga. However, since secondary teams aren't eligible for promotion to 2.Bundesliga, Bayern Munich II will remain in 3. Liga for the 2020–21 season. Bayern II failed to defend their 3. Liga title in the 2020-21 season, finishing 18th, and were relegated to the Regionalliga Bayern.

Stadium
Bayern II play at the Grünwalder Stadion, which was the first team's venue until the opening of the Olympiastadion in 1972. During the 2012–13 season Bayern II moved to Sportpark Heimstetten, the home stadium of SV Heimstetten, caused by renovation of the Grünwalder Stadion.

Kit suppliers and shirt sponsors

Players

Squad

Out on loan

Coaching staff

Recent managers
Recent managers of the club:

 Heinz Lettl (1 July 1973 – 30 June 1974)
 Werner Kern (1 July 1976 – 31 May 1977)
 Fritz Bischoff (1 July 1986 – 30 June 1987)
 Hans-Dieter Schmidt (1 July 1987 – 30 June 1989)
 Fritz Bischoff (1 July 1989 – 30 June 1990)
 Wolf Werner (1 July 1990 – 30 June 1992)
 Hermann Gerland (1 July 1991 – 30 June 1995)
 Rainer Ulrich (1 July 1995 – 30 June 1998)
 Udo Bassemir (1 July 1998 – 28 March 2001)
 Kurt Niedermayer (29 March 2001 – 30 June 2001)
 Hermann Gerland (1 July 2001 – 26 April 2009)
 Mehmet Scholl (27 April 2009 – 30 June 2010)
 Hermann Gerland (1 July 2010 – 13 April 2011)
 Rainer Ulrich (13 April 2011 – 30 June 2011)
 Andries Jonker (1 July 2011 – 30 June 2012)
 Mehmet Scholl (1 July 2012 – 30 June 2013)
 Erik ten Hag (1 July 2013 – 30 June 2015)
 Heiko Vogel (1 July 2015 – 21 March 2017)
 Danny Schwarz (21 March 2017 – 30 June 2017)
 Tim Walter (1 July 2017 – 30 June 2018)
 Holger Seitz (1 July 2018 – 30 June 2019)
 Sebastian Hoeneß (1 July 2019 – 26 July 2020)
 Holger Seitz (25 August 2020 – 4 April 2021)
 Danny Schwarz (4 April 2021 – 30 June 2021)
 Martín Demichelis (4 April 2021 – 13 September 2022)
 Holger Seitz (September 2022 – present)

Honours
The club's honours:

League
 German amateur football championship 
 Runners-up: 1982–83, 1986–87
 Quateur Finals: 1983–84
 Amateurliga Südbayern (III) 
 Runners-up: 1957–58, 1960–61
 Amateur Oberliga Bayern (III) 
 Runners-up: 1982–83, 1983–84, 1986–87
 Regionalliga Süd (III) 
 Champions: 2003–04
 3. Liga (III) 
 Champions: 2019–20*
 2. Amateurliga Oberbayern A (IV) 
 Champions: 1955–56
 Landesliga Bayern-Süd (IV) 
 Champions: 1966–67, 1972–73*
 Regionalliga Bayern (IV)
 Champions: 2013–14*, 2018–19*
 Runners-up: 2012–13, 2014–15, 2016–17, 2017–18, 2021–22

20xx* both champions with first team: FC Bayern Munich

Cup
 DFB Pokal 
 Participations: 1975, 1977, 1983, 1985, 1994, 1995, 1996, 2003, 2005.
 Quarter-finals: 1995, 2005
 Bavarian Cup 
 Winners: 2002
 Finalist: 1995 (share with 1.FC Numberg II – no winner)
 Oberbayern Cup 
 Winners: 1995, 2001, 2002

International
 Premier League International Cup
 Winners: 2019 
 IFA Shield (IFA)
 Winners: 2005

Recent record

The recent season-by-season performance of the club:

DNQ = Bayern II did not qualify for the cup in that season;— = Since 2008–09 season reserve teams of professional clubs are no longer allowed to compete in the cup
With the introduction of the Bezirksoberligas in 1988 as the new fifth tier, below the Landesligas, all leagues below dropped one tier. With the introduction of the Regionalligas in 1994 and the 3. Liga in 2008 as the new third tier, below the 2. Bundesliga, all leagues below dropped one tier. With the establishment of the Regionalliga Bayern as the new fourth tier in Bavaria in 2012 the Bayernliga was split into a northern and a southern division, the number of Landesligas expanded from three to five and the Bezirksoberligas abolished. All leagues from the Bezirksligas onward were elevated one tier.

Past players

References

External links

Statistics at fussballdaten.de 
FC Bayern Munich II profile at Weltfussball.de

Reserves
Bavarian reserve football teams
German reserve football teams
Association football clubs established in 1900
Premier League International Cup
3. Liga clubs